Maxime Prévot (born April 9, 1978) is a Belgian politician who is currently the president of the Les Engagés party and has served as the Mayor of Namur since 2012.

Biography
Prévot was born in Mons in 1978 to a middle-class family. He spent part of his upbringing in Luxembourg. Prévot studied political science at the University of Namur and then completed a law conversion course at UCLouvain before working for PricewaterhouseCoopers.

Prévot first became involved in politics when he joined the youth chapter of the cdH in Namur. During the 2006 municipal elections in Belgium, he was elected as a councilor on the Provincial Council of Namur. In 2012, he succeeded Jacques Étienne as Mayor of Namur. In the 2014 Belgian regional elections, he was elected to the Parliament of Wallonia as the number one candidate for the Namur constituency list.

In January 2019, former cdH president Benoit Lutgen announced his intention to step down as leader. Prévot entered his name in the leadership race and was subsequently elected as the party's new president with 85% of the vote.

Political positions
Prévot has been described as coming from the more centre-right camp of the cdH with some of his ideas being close to that of the Mouvement Réformateur. However, he has also described himself as holding progressive opinions on some issues.

Following poor results for the cdH during the 2019 elections, Prévot announced a plan to rejuvenate and reorganize the party, including updating its policies and changing its identity and branding. In 2022, the party announced it would change its name from the cdH to Les Engagés.

References

1978 births
Living people
Members of the Parliament of Wallonia
Centre démocrate humaniste politicians
21st-century Belgian politicians
People from Mons
Université de Namur alumni
PricewaterhouseCoopers people
Mayors of places in Belgium